Obritzberg-Rust is a municipality in the district of Sankt Pölten-Land in Lower Austria, Austria.

The municipality is divided into 19 cadastral communities. These are Diendorf, Doppel (with the localities of Doppel, Neustift and Hofstetten), Eitzendorf, Flinsdorf, Fugging, Greiling, Großrust, Grünz, Hain (with the localities of Kleinhain, Angern and Großhain), Heinigstetten, Kleinrust, Landhausen, Obermerking, Obritzberg, Pfaffing, Schweinern (with the localities of Schweinern and Thallern), Untermerking (with the localities of Untermerking and Mittermerking), Winzing and Zagging.

Population

References

Cities and towns in St. Pölten-Land District